Ed Kennedy (born 19 September 1994) is an Australian rugby union player who plays for the Scarlets in the Pro14 competition.  His position of choice is flanker and Lock. He is Welsh qualified.

References

External links 
Scarlets profile
itsrugby.co.uk profile

Australian rugby union players
Living people
Scarlets players
1994 births
Rugby union locks
Rugby union flankers
Sydney (NRC team) players
ACT Brumbies players
Rugby union players from Sydney